U-3 may refer to one of the following German submarines:

 , lead ship of the Type U-3 class of submarines; launched in 1909 and served in the First World War as a training submarine; surrendered in 1918
 During the First World War, Germany also had these submarines with similar names:
 , a Type UB I submarine launched in 1915 and sunk on 23 May 1915
 , a Type UC I submarine launched in 1915 and sunk on 27 May 1916
 , a Type IIA submarine that served in the Second World War and was scrapped in 1945
 , a Type 201 submarine of the Bundesmarine that was launched in 1964; loaned out to Royal Norwegian Navy from 1964 to 1966; later broken up

U-3 or U-III may also refer to:
 , lead boat of the  submarines for the Austro-Hungarian Navy

See also
U-3 (disambiguation)

Submarines of Germany